Salisbury railway station serves the city of Salisbury in Wiltshire, England. This is crossed by the Wessex Main Line from Bristol Temple Meads to Southampton Central. The station is operated and served by South Western Railway (SWR), and is also served by Great Western Railway (GWR).

History

London and South Western Railway

The LSWR opened their Milford station on the east side of the city on 1 March 1847, with the opening of their branch line from Eastleigh to passenger traffic. This was the city's only railway until 30 June 1856, when the GWR opened the Salisbury branch from Westbury. On 1 May 1857, the LSWR opened the extended main line from London and Andover, at first to the Milford station.

On 2 May 1859, the LSWR opened a station on the south side of the 1856 GWR station, west of Fisherton Street, to coincide with the opening of the first section of the Salisbury and Yeovil Railway. At the same time, the terminus of the Andover line moved to the new station, having been brought across the city, partly through a tunnel. The building is largely of two stories and has a central main entrance; the architect was Sir William Tite, who was responsible for a number of LSWR stations.

As the GWR and LSWR used different gauges, through goods traffic had to be unloaded and transhipped in a transfer shed; a covered footbridge was opened in 1860 linking the two stations, to allow passengers to change trains. The LSWR station had a single long platform served by trains in both directions and a second bay platform was provided at the London end.

In the 1870s the LSWR opened a second platform, east of Fisherton Street, for services towards London; it had an entrance from the street and was linked to the old platform by a subway, and there was another bay platform for trains to the east.

The LSWR station was again enlarged between 1899 and 1902, and the 1870s platform east of Fisherton Street could then be closed. Two new platforms serving three tracks were opened between the GWR platforms and the original LSWR one, reached by a subway from the LSWR's new station offices, which were built in red brick on the west side of their original building of 1859.

In 2008, the group of buildings (1859 and 1902) was designated as Grade II listed.

Great Western Railway

The terminus was on the west side of Salisbury on the west side of Fisherton Street. Isambard Kingdom Brunel provided a station with a wooden train shed to cover the tracks and a single-storey building of red brick with stone dressings to house booking offices and waiting rooms.

The GWR converted their line to  standard gauge in 1874, and four years later a connecting line was laid to the neighbouring 1859 LSWR station, which allowed wagons to be shunted between the two stations. In 1896 a through service between Cardiff on the GWR and Portsmouth on the LSWR began operating over a junction line at Salisbury.  The two companies' lines ran alongside each other from Salisbury as far as Wilton (where they finally diverged although there was no connection between the lines there) until October 1973, when a new junction between the lines was put in at Wilton and the former GWR route closed.

On 12 September 1932 the GWR's passenger trains were transferred to the LSWR station, and the two railways were in common ownership by British Railways from 1 January 1948. The train shed was demolished but Brunel's passenger buildings were designated as Grade II listed in 1972 and are in use as offices by non-railway businesses.

Goods facilities 
The former Salisbury Milford station was used as a goods station until it was closed in 1967 and demolished in 1968. Goods traffic was also handled in goods sheds at the west end of the Fisherton station – north of the GWR station and south of the LSWR station – and also on the  Market House branch from the east end of the LSWR station which opened in 1859. A new LSWR marshalling yard was opened on the site of the old platform east of Fisherton Street after it had closed in 1902, but the main LSWR goods depot was kept at the old Milford station until 1967. The former GWR station remained in use as a goods depot until 1991.

Motive power depots 
An engine shed, water tower and turntable were erected on the Milford site from January 1847, as the line was then open for freight traffic. A replacement engine shed was built by the LSWR at Fisherton Street in 1859. The GWR also built a small engine shed adjacent to their station in April 1858. This was demolished in 1899 to allow expansion of the LSWR station, and a replacement built on the north side of the line. This was closed by British Railways in 1950.

A large new and well equipped engine shed was opened by the LSWR on 12 January 1901. This remained in use until the end of steam in southern England on 9 July 1967. The shed lay derelict for some years before being demolished.

The sidings around the former GWR station were redeveloped in 1992 as Salisbury Traincare Depot, where South Western Railway maintain their fleet of DMUs.

Accidents and incidents 
In the early morning of 1 July 1906, an overnight boat train derailed in Salisbury station, killing 24 passengers and 4 railwaymen.

Description

The approach road from the city is accessed from a junction on the south side of the railway bridge across Fisherton Street, which leads into a one-way car park with 287 spaces. The large building on the right of the approach road is the old LSWR buildings of 1859, which now houses the Salisbury signal panel. Immediately next door is the red brick building of 1902, now the main entrance where the ticket office and buffet are located.

The main platform adjacent to the entrance is platform 4 which is mainly used for trains towards Exeter and Cardiff, as is platform 3 opposite. Platform 5 is a bay platform at the west end which is no longer used by passenger trains.

Beyond platform 2 is another disused platform, formerly platform 1. Behind this are the sidings of the Traincare Depot; at the east end of this is an old water tank and the brick offices which once served the GWR station.

Services

Until late 2009, Services to Exeter would extend on a limited basis to Penzance, Plymouth & Paignton. These services were removed in favour of hourly Waterloo to Exeter services. Until December 2021 a limited number of South Western Railway services operated to Bristol Temple Meads, with a train dividing here from a service to Exeter.

In 2022, South Western Railway added a "Welcome Host" at the station, a staff member who provides information and sells tickets.

References

External links

Panoramic photograph of Salisbury station
Three Rivers Community Rail Partnership

Railway stations in Wiltshire
Former Great Western Railway stations
Former London and South Western Railway stations
Railway stations in Great Britain opened in 1859
Railway stations served by Great Western Railway
Railway stations served by South Western Railway
Grade II listed railway stations
Salisbury
DfT Category C1 stations